John Bell Jr. (October 4, 1937 – November 8, 2013) was an acclaimed American painter and sculptor whose career spanned nearly fifty years.

Bell was born in Fort Smith, Arkansas on October 4, 1937, the son of Oklahoma-born parents John Sr. and Lillian L. Bell (née Sweeten). He graduated from Northside High School and University of Arkansas in 1965.

In August 2013, Bell was diagnosed with stomach cancer. He subsequently died of the illness on November 8, 2013, aged 76, at his Fort Smith home. Bell was survived by his wife, Maxine, of fifty years, a daughter (born 1965), a granddaughter, and his brother.

Legacy 
In 2022, the city of Fort Smith, Arkansas approved the naming of a new park along Riverfront Drive after the late artist. John Bell Jr. Park will be 51 acres and include soccer fields, an inclusive playground, and options for future expansion.

References 

1937 births
2013 deaths
Deaths from cancer in Arkansas
Deaths from stomach cancer
20th-century American painters
American sculptors
People from Fort Smith, Arkansas
21st-century American painters
Sculptors from Arkansas